TEM ("transport and energy module\unit", NPPS in English) is an under development nuclear propulsion spacecraft with the intention to facilitate the transportation of large cargoes in deep space. It will be constructed by the Russian Keldysh Research Center, NIKIET (Research and Design Institute of Power Engineering) institute, and Rosatom.

Mission 
A Russian project to create an uncrewed nuclear electric rocket spaceship for Solar system exploration. The first reactor tests are scheduled for the early 2020s; as of May 2020, the first orbital flight test of the reactor is planned for no earlier than 2030. The first mission, named Zeus, is envisioned to operate for 50 months and deliver payloads to the Moon, Venus, and Jupiter through multiple gravity assists.

Specifications

Reactor 
 Coolant: 78% helium/22% xenon.
 Heat power: 3.8 MW
 Electric power: 1 MW

Spacecraft 
 Mass: 20,290 kg (limited by Angara 5 carrying capacity)
 Thrust: 18 N
 Specific impulse: 7000 s
 Space-launch vehicle: Angara

Project history 
 2009 – Project started.
 March 2016 – First batch of nuclear fuel received
 October 2018 – Successful initial tests of the water droplet radiator system
 May 2021 – Zeus mission proposed by Roscosmos and the Russian Academy of Sciences

See also
 Nuclear electric rocket
 Project Prometheus
 RD-0410
 9M730 Burevestnik

References

External links 
 Article on NIKIET site (Russian)

Nuclear spacecraft propulsion
Roscosmos
2030 in science